Cirsium douglasii is a species of thistle known by the common names Douglas' thistle and California swamp thistle.

It is native to the central coast and northern California ranges, foothills, and plateaus, and adjacent parts of southern Oregon and northwest Nevada. It grows in wet places in a number of types of habitat.

Description
They are sometimes lobed or toothed and are borne on a spiny petiole.

The inflorescence is a cluster of several flower heads surrounded by small leaves. The head contains purple or white flowers.

Varieties
 Cirsium douglasii var. breweri (A.Gray) D.J.Keil & C.E.Turner - California, Oregon, Nevada
 Cirsium douglasii var. douglasii  - California

References

External links

Jepson Manual treatment — Cirsium douglasii
Cirsium douglasii — Calphotos Photos gallery, University of California

douglasii
Flora of the Western United States
Natural history of the California chaparral and woodlands
Natural history of the California Coast Ranges
Natural history of the San Francisco Bay Area
Plants described in 1838
Flora without expected TNC conservation status